Notocupoides is an extinct genus of beetles in the family Ommatidae, known from the Carnian Madygen Formation of Kyrgyzstan, containing the following species:

 Notocupoides capitatus Ponomarenko, 1966
 Notocupoides fasciatus Ponomarenko, 1966
 Notocupoides triassicus Ponomarenko, 1966

References

Ommatidae
Prehistoric beetle genera